The 2025 Suffolk County Council election will take place on 1 May 2021 as part of the 2025 local elections in the United Kingdom. All 70 councillors will be elected from electoral divisions across the county, which will return either one or two county councillors each, by first-past-the-post voting, for a four-year term of office.

This election will be first taken after the implementation of a review by Local Government Boundary Commission for England which will reduce the number of councillors from 75 to 70.

Voters who live in divisions which elected two councillors are entitled to cast a maximum of two votes, while those living in divisions only electing one councillor are only entitled to cast one vote.

Previous composition

2021 election

Composition of council seats before election

Changes between elections

In between the 2021 election and the 2025 election, the following council seats changed hands outside of by-elections:

Overall Results

|}

Results summaries by district

Babergh

East Suffolk

Ipswich

Mid Suffolk

West Suffolk

Results by ward

References

2025 English local elections
21st century in Suffolk
2021